The Trembling Hour is a 1919 American silent mystery film directed by George Siegmann and starring Helen Jerome Eddy, Kenneth Harlan and Henry A. Barrows.

Cast
 Helen Jerome Eddy as Margy Webb
 Kenneth Harlan as Major Ralph Dunstan
 Henry A. Barrows as George Belding
 Willis Marks as Bull Barnes
 Clyde E. Hopkins as John Belding 
 Edna Shipman as Alice Belding
 Gertrude Astor as Mrs. Byrnie
 Anna Mae Walthall as Pauline

References

Bibliography
 Codori, Jeff. Film History Through Trade Journal Art, 1916-1920. McFarland, 2020.

External links
 

1919 mystery films
American silent feature films
American mystery films
American black-and-white films
Films directed by George Siegmann
Universal Pictures films
1910s English-language films
1910s American films
Silent mystery films